The Vermont–North Macedonia National Guard Partnership is one of 25 European partnerships that make-up the U.S. European Command State Partnership Program and one of 88 worldwide partnerships that make-up the National Guard State Partnership Program. The partnership between the Vermont National Guard (VTNG) and the Army of the Republic of Macedonia (ARM) has flourished since its establishment in 1993. In 2012, the VTNG was awarded the Macedonian Military Order of Merit by President Gjorge Ivanov, in appreciation of VTNG's commitment to the ARM. Vermont continues to support Macedonia's armed forces as their professionalism and capability increase.

History

 79 Macedonian soldiers co-deployed with the 86th IBCT (MTN) in OEF X.
 The President of North Macedonia visited Vermont in September 2009.
 In 2012, President of North Macedonia awarded Vermont National Guard with highest military decoration, the Military Order of Merit.
 15 Military-to-Military (M2M) events scheduled for completion in 2013, to include the 2013 NATO Comprehensive Operations Planning Division (COPD) Logistical Exercise 2013, which will be held in North Macedonia.
 Contention with Greece over constitutional name continues to challenge acceptance into EU/NATO.

Partnership focus

The focus of the partnership is accession into NATO and the EU.

Military to Military (M2M):
 Continued commitment to reaching Security Cooperation Goals
 Continued support for Non Lethal Weapon capability and PKO deployments
 Support ARM Transformations for 2015 (Med Inf Btl Grp)
 Trilateral engagements (Vermont, North Macedonia, Senegal)

2013 events include Operational Logistics, National Defense Organization and Cyber Security.

Gallery

References

External links

  News items and photographs.
  Macedonians at Camp Ethan Allen, news items and photographs.
  Outline of contemporary diplomatic relations with Macedonia.
 

Vermont National Guard
Military alliances involving the United States
North Macedonia–United States military relations